Watisoni Votu (born 25 March 1985 in Lautoka, Fiji) is a Fijian rugby union player. He plays Wing or Centre for Fiji on international level. Watisoni also played for the province, Lautoka. Following a series of visa complications Votu's transfer was delayed to English Aviva Premiership side Exeter Chiefs,

Watisoni Votu got to be a part of the Fiji Sevens team in 2009 for the 2008-09 IRB 7s World Series.

In February 2012, Votu trialled with rugby league team, Newcastle Knights in hope of a contract but instead chose to consider offers from overseas.

Votu made his debut for Fiji in 2012 against Japan in the Pacific Nations Cup. He then was named in the sides 2012 end of year tour campaign. Votu took part in all four matches, playing against Gloucester, Ireland XV, Georgia and England.

Votu transfer to Exeter was completed on 9 January 2013. This took Exeter even longer due to an incident that took place in Levuka Town in Ovalau, Fiji in which Votu allegedly assaulted a woman. It was announced on 20 April 2013 that Votu at the conclusion of the 2012/2013 season will join French side USA Perpignan.

In April 2015, Votu signed for newly promoted Top 14 side, Pau.

References

External links

fijirugby profile

Fijian rugby union players
Fiji international rugby union players
Fijian expatriate rugby union players
Expatriate rugby union players in England
Fijian expatriate sportspeople in England
1985 births
Living people
Exeter Chiefs players
USA Perpignan players
Fijian expatriate sportspeople in France
Expatriate rugby union players in France
Rugby union wings
Sportspeople from Lautoka
I-Taukei Fijian people
Section Paloise players